Warbleton Priory was a medieval monastic house in East Sussex, England. The current house is a Grade II* listed building.

References

External links 
 

Monasteries in East Sussex
Priory